The Salt in My Tears may refer to:

"The Salt in My Tears" (Dolly Parton song)
"The Salt in My Tears" (Martin Briley song)